Club de Fútbol Sporting Mahonés was a Spanish football team based in Mahón, Menorca, in the autonomous community of Balearic Islands prior to its 2012 dissolution. The club has a successor called Sporting Mahón in the local Menorcan league.

C.F. Sporting Mahonés resulted from the merger of two other Mahon teams, Club Deportivo Menorca and Union Deportiva Mahon, in July 1974. They began life in the regional divisions of Balearic football before progressing to the Spanish Third Division in 1977–78.

On 24 January 2012 the team announced it was withdrawing from the Segunda División B – Group 3, in mid-season, due to the fact that practically all the professional squad had left the club. With debts of over 230,000 euros and a transfer embargo in place, the club could not raise a team for the remainder of the season. Their final game was a 0–6 defeat at Sant Andreu.

Between formation and 1978, Sporting played at two locations close to the centre of town, starting out at the former home of CD Menorca, the Campo Municipal de San Carlos. The following season saw the club play at the Estadio Mahonés, which had been the home of UD Mahón. More latterly home matches were played at the 3,000 seat capacity Estadio Bintaufa, situated to the south of the city, close to the Aeronautic Club.

Season to season

9 seasons in Segunda División B
26 seasons in Tercera División

Last squad
According to Futbolme. Updated on 29 July 2011

Notable former players
 Ruslan Elá
 Vicente Engonga
 Torres Mestre
 Joaquín Moso

References

External links
Official website 
Futbolme.com profile 

Football clubs in the Balearic Islands
Sport in Menorca
Association football clubs established in 1974
Association football clubs disestablished in 2012
Defunct football clubs in the Balearic Islands
1974 establishments in Spain
2012 disestablishments in Spain
Mahón